Indus World School (IWS) is a chain of coeducational, K-12 schools run by the Nalanda Foundation. The first school was started in 2005 at Hyderabad, India and the second one in 2006 at Indore. There were 11 schools . New Indus World Schools are expected to open at Hassan in Karnataka, Dharuhera in Haryana and a second school at Hyderabad.

The Indus World School was established by IIT and IIM alumni R. Satya Narayanan, Gautam Puri, Sujit Bhattacharyya, R. Srinivasan, D. Vijay Kumar and Shiv Kumar.

References 

More information of the school and the promoters can be accessed at https://indus.school/ and about the parent company Career Launcher at www.careerlauncher.in

External links 
 
Official Youtube channel

Private schools in Telangana
Private schools in Madhya Pradesh
Schools in Indore
Schools in Hyderabad, India
2005 establishments in Andhra Pradesh
Educational institutions established in 2005